South Tower may refer to:

 South Tower (Brussels), a building in Brussels, Belgium
 South Tower, 2 World Trade Center prior to its destruction on September 11, 2001
 South Tower, 10 Hudson Yards, a skyscraper in New York City
  The South Tower (sculpture), an art piece by Don Gummer based on the collapse of 2 World Trade Center

See also 
 North Tower (disambiguation)